JKT48 School is a variety show was aired on Global TV which aims to recognize the members of JKT48 more closely. Hosted by John Martin Tumbel which serves as class guardian, JKT48 School aired on April 15 until June 3, 2012. This show was adopted from TV Tokyo's Shukan AKB.

Each guest star attending JKT48 School will act as a teacher in different fields of study for each episode.

Casts 
Every episode, the cast (members) can change at any time.

 Class guardian (host) :
John Martin Tumbel

 Students (JKT48 all members) :
Alissa Galliamova, Ayana Shahab, Beby Chaesara Anadila, Cindy Gulla, Cleopatra Djapri, Delima Rizky, Devi Kinal Putri, Diasta Priswarini, Frieska Anastasia Laksani, Gabriela Margareth Warouw, Ghaida Farisya, Jessica Vania, Jessica Veranda, Melody Nurramdhani Laksani, Nabilah Ratna Ayu Azalia, Neneng Rosediana, Rena Nozawa, Rezky Wiranti Dhike, Rica Leyona, Sendy Ariani, Shania Junianatha, Sonia Natalia, Sonya Pandarmawan, Stella Cornelia

Episode list

JKT48 News 
The JKT48 News segment is present at the end of each episode of the program. Contains information related to JKT48, starting from routine activities, member practices, till concerts. This segment hosted by Melody Nurramdhani Laksani (for 2nd episode of JKT48 School, hosted by Shania Junianatha).

JKT48
Indonesian variety television shows
2012 Indonesian television series debuts
2012 Indonesian television series endings
2010s Indonesian television series